"Comin' After You" is the second single from rapper MC Ren's third studio album, Ruthless for Life. It features former N.W.A bandmember Ice Cube and it is the first time the duo had worked together since the split of N.W.A The song was produced by DJ Bobcat who also produced MC Ren's debut EP, Kizz My Black Azz.

Track listing
 "Comin' After You" (LP Version) 
 "Comin' After You" (Instrumental)
 "Comin' After You" (A Capella)
 "Comin' After You" (Clean Version)
 "Comin' After You" (Clean A Cappella)

References

Ruthless Records singles
Songs written by MC Ren
Songs written by Ice Cube
1998 singles
MC Ren songs
1998 songs
Gangsta rap songs